The women's 400 metres at the 2021 World Athletics U20 Championships was held at the Kasarani Stadium 18 and 21 August.

Records

Results

Heats
Qualification: First 2 of each heat (Q) and the 2 fastest times (q) qualified for the final.

Final
The final was held on 21 August at 16:59.

References

400 metres
400 metres at the World Athletics U20 Championships
U20